John Cooper (18 December 1940 – 3 March 1974) was a British athlete who competed mainly in the 400 metre hurdles.

He competed for Great Britain in the 1964 Summer Olympics held in Tokyo, Japan in the 400 metre hurdles, where he won the silver medal.  He then joined with teammates Tim Graham, Adrian Metcalfe, and Robbie Brightwell in the 4 x 400 metres relay, where they won the silver medal. Cooper also competed in the 400 metre hurdles at the 1968 Summer Olympics in Mexico, serving as Great Britain's third-string athlete in this event, behind gold medallist David Hemery and bronze medallist John Sherwood.

Cooper originally went to school at Lutterworth Grammar School. He was killed in the Turkish Airlines Flight 981 crash in the Ermenonville Forest near, Paris (France), on 3 March 1974.

References

Notes
Wallechinsky, David. (1984). The Complete Book of the Olympics. New York: Penguin Books. pp. 57, 67.

1940 births
1974 deaths
British male hurdlers
British male sprinters
Olympic silver medallists for Great Britain
Athletes (track and field) at the 1964 Summer Olympics
Athletes (track and field) at the 1968 Summer Olympics
Olympic athletes of Great Britain
Victims of aviation accidents or incidents in 1974
Victims of aviation accidents or incidents in France
People educated at Lutterworth College
Medalists at the 1964 Summer Olympics
Olympic silver medalists in athletics (track and field)
Universiade medalists in athletics (track and field)
Universiade bronze medalists for Great Britain